The Model European Parliament (MEP) is an international simulation of the working of the European Parliament for students aged 16–19. The aim of the programme is to give young people an insight into the workings of the European Parliament and raise their awareness of European citizenship. Two sessions are held each year, each involving 180 secondary school students.

Format
The format of the MEP resembles that of the actual European Parliament: approximately 15 delegates of different nationalities form a committee that debates a certain topic extensively and drafts a resolution, a non-binding piece of legislation outlining the key issues of the topic and proposing solutions. The drafting process is followed by lobbying, during which delegates may debate and propose amendments for other resolutions. The finale of a session is the General Assembly (GA). During this, resolutions and amendments are debated and voted upon by all of the delegates. Any successful resolutions are then forwarded to the European Parliament, the European Commission and the Council of the European Union.
The elder members are titled as Presidents or Chairs, while the youngers are entitled as delegates.

Participating countries

, participants come from all 28 member states of the European Union and two candidate countries: Republic of Macedonia and Turkey. Each country can choose five delegates in any way they deem appropriate. Many hold regional and/or national sessions using the same format but with a smaller scope.

List of international sessions
The following international sessions have been held or announced:

1994 Spring: , The Hague/Maastricht
1995 Spring: , The Hague
1996 Spring: , Paris
1996 Autumn: , Dublin
1997 Spring: , Stowe/Oxford
1997 Autumn: , Carpi/Bologna
1998 Spring: , Stockholm
1998 Autumn: , Madrid
1999 Spring: , Bonn
1999 Autumn: , Luxembourg
2000 Spring: , Lisbon
2000 Autumn: , Vienna
2001 Spring: , Copenhagen
2001 Autumn: , Rotterdam
2002 Spring: , Ljubljana
2002 Autumn: , Dublin
2003 Spring: , Helsinki
2003 Autumn: , Athens
2004 Spring: , Warsaw
2004 Spring: , Luxembourg
2004 Autumn: , Budapest
2005 Spring: , The Hague
2005 Autumn: , Madrid
2006 Spring: , Vilnius
2006 Autumn: , Ljutomer / Ljubljana
2007 Spring: , Sofia
2007 Autumn: , Rome
2008 Spring: , Stockholm
2008 Autumn: , Bratislava
2009 Spring: , Nicosia
2009 Autumn: , Bonn
2010 Spring: , The Hague
2010 Autumn: , Istanbul
2011 Spring: , Tallinn
2011 Autumn: , Skopje
2012 Spring: , Ljutomer / Ljubljana
2012 Autumn: , Madrid
2013 Spring: , Norwich
2013 Autumn: , Vilnius
2014 Spring: , Vienna
2014 Autumn: , Luxembourg
2015 Spring: , Naples / Rome
2015 Autumn: , Berlin 	
2016 Spring: , Budapest 	
2016 Autumn: , Copenhagen
2017 Spring: , Maastricht
2017 Autumn: , Helsinki
2018 Spring: , Tallinn
2018 Autumn: , Toledo / Madrid
2019 Spring: , Paris / Strasbourg
2019 Autumn: , Valletta
2020 Autumn: , Stockholm (online)
2021 Spring: , Vienna (online)
2021 Autumn: , Berlin (online)
2022 Spring: , Bucharest
2022 Autumn: , Sofia
2023 Spring: , Brussels
2023 Autumn: , Prague
2024 Spring: , Tartuu
2024 Autumn: , Athens

Model European Parliament Baltic Sea Region
The Model European Parliament Baltic Sea Region (MEP BSR) is an international organization that includes eight member states of the EU situated in the Baltic Sea Region, but also welcomes delegates from Iceland, Norway and Russia (Kaliningrad). The MEP BSR, which is organised and managed by the Model European Parliament BSR Association, uses the same format as the main international MEPs, but with ten delegates representing each country rather than five.

List of MEP BSR sessions:

2005 Spring: , Copenhagen
2006 Spring: , Tallinn
2006 Autumn: , Bremen
2007 Spring: /, Øresund Region
2007 Autumn: , Riga
2008 Spring: , Helsinki
2008 Autumn: , St. Petersburg
2009 Spring: , Toruń
2009 Autumn: , Copenhagen
2010 Spring: , Stockholm
2010 Autumn: , Kaliningrad
2011 Spring: , Vilnius
2011 Autumn: , Gdańsk/Gdynia
2012 Spring: , Copenhagen
2012 Autumn: , Leipzig
2013 Spring: , Reykjavik
2013 Autumn: , Brugge/Blankenberge
2014 Spring: , Tartu
2014 Autumn: , Stockholm
2015 Spring: , Helsinki
2015 Autumn: , Oslo/Nesbru
2016 Spring: , Riga
2016 Autumn: , Kaliningrad
2017 Spring: , Elverum
2017 Autumn: , Riga
2018 Spring: , Iława
2018 Autumn: , Sønderborg
2019 Spring: , Copenhagen
2019 Autumn: , Vienna
2021 Autumn: , Copenhagen
2022 Autumn: , Potsdam
2023 Autumn: , Oslo

Model European Parliament Central and South East Europe
The Model European Parliament Central and South East Europe (MEP CSEE) is an organisation largely similar to MEP BSR, but it invites students from member states Austria, Slovenia, the Czech Republic, Germany, Slovakia, Hungary, Romania, Bulgaria, candidate countries the Republic of Macedonia, Serbia, and neighbouring countries Moldova, Bosnia-Herzegovina and Montenegro.

List of MEP CSEE sessions:
2015 Autumn: , Bucharest
2016 Autumn: , Sofia
2017 Autumn:
2018 Autumn: , Vienna
2019 Autumn: , Budapest
2021 Spring: , Bratislava (online)
2021 Autumn: , Bucharest (online)
2022 Autumn: , Szeged
2023 Autumn: , Munich/Kirchheim bei München

Model European Parliament Western European Region
A Western European version was launched in Autumn 2016 with the participation of Belgium, France, Germany, the United Kingdom, Luxembourg, Ireland and the Netherlands.

List of WEMEP sessions: 
2016 Autumn: , The Hague
2018 Spring: , Lier
2019 Spring: , Koblenz/Bonn
2020 Spring: , Luxembourg City
2023 Spring: , The Hague

Model European Parliament Mediterranean Region 
The Model European Parliament Mediterranean Region is a non-partisan leadership programme for youth in Mediterranean countries. The aim of the MED MEP Region programme is to develop interest and skills in addressing high level international issues jointly among high-school students. The program is a training ground for future leaders and politicians, and is mainly aimed at Italy, Croatia, Albania, Greece, Spain, Portugal, Malta, Cyprus, France and Turkey

List of MEP MED sessions:

 2017 Autumn: , Naples
 2018: Autumn: , Athens
 2019: Autumn: , Nicosia
 2022: Autumn: , Milan
 2023: Autumn: , Madrid

Similar projects
The European Youth Parliament and Model European Union are separate projects, but follow the same format as the Model European Parliament to some extent.

See also
Model United Nations

References

Politics of the European Union
Youth model government
Youth organizations based in Europe